The Worshipful Company of Tylers and Bricklayers is one of the livery companies of the City of London. The organisation of Tylers (roof and floor tile layers) and Bricklayers existed in 1416; it was incorporated by a royal charter in 1568. Originally, the company possessed a monopoly over bricklaying within the City of London. However, after the Great Fire of London, the king decreed that brick or stone, instead of timber, should be used in the building of homes. There was too much rebuilding to be done by only the Tylers' and Bricklayers' Company; craftsmen from across England were summoned, and the monopoly was terminated. The company now exists, along with most livery companies, primarily as a charitable body. The company also supports various building schools.
	
The Tylers' and Bricklayers' Company ranks thirty-seventh in the order of precedence of livery companies.

Brief history

The earliest reference to the company is in 1416 though records show that a guild representing the crafts was in existence well before that time. The company's charter was granted in 1568. A City ordinance of 1570 defined its area of control as being within a radius of 15 miles of the City.

The company flourished initially with brick and tiles being used in place of timber and thatch. The Great Fire of 1666 led to a royal proclamation requiring their use. The rebuilding programme was beyond the capacity of company members; craftsmen flocked in from elsewhere and the monopoly was broken. The succeeding years saw a continuing reduction in the influence and fortunes of the company which nonetheless retained ownership of a hail until the end of the 19th century and almshouses in Islington into the second half of the 20th century. Masters and liverymen of the company have ensured that it still plays its part in support of the City, its crafts and numerous charitable causes.

Two of the company's liverymen have served as Lord Mayor of London.

Membership

Members of the company are drawn from a very wide range of backgrounds. Applications are welcomed not only from those with family, craft or professional links with the company but also from anyone, working in the City or elsewhere, or retired, who wishes to support and uphold the objectives of the company set out on the cover.

Fellowship and social activities

A range of social and educational events are arranged which allow members, their wives and guests the opportunity of dining in some of the City's finest livery halls and of visiting some of its greatest and historic institutions.

Support for the crafts

The company, unusually for livery companies, supports three separate recognised crafts within the building industry. These are bricklaying, roof slating and tiling, and hard-surface wall and floor tiling – crafts which are each as relevant today as they were five hundred years ago.
The company has always taken a special interest in those training in these crafts. It awards prizes for excellence achieved by students on courses at vocational colleges and in The Corps of Royal Engineers, the company's link regiment, and also for success in craft competitions such as Skillbuild. It is actively involved in a scheme leading to the revived qualification of Master Craftsman. Every three years the company makes awards in each of its crafts to buildings or projects completed in that period.

Awards

The company makes a number of awards as part of its historic commitment to encouraging the very highest levels of craftsmanship in – bricklaying, roof slating and tiling and hard-surface wall and floor tiling – crafts which are as relevant today as they were five hundred years ago.

Craft Awards 

Each year it makes awards to college students and military trainees. These are, respectively, to the students who come through the regional heats of the annual SkillBuild competition to win the national final in each of the three crafts and to Senior and Junior construction trainees at the Corps of Royal Engineers’ Training School at Chatham.

Triennial Awards 

Every three years the company makes an award to the three buildings or structures, in the area bounded by the M25 motorway, which respectively embody the most outstanding example of brickwork, of slated or tiled roof and of hard-surface tiled wall and/or floor. All those principally responsible for each Tylers and Bricklayers Triennial Award-winning scheme are recognised, with the company's Silver Medal being presented to the craft trade foreman.

Master Craftsman 

The company also recognises those who achieve higher levels of competence in the crafts of bricklaying, roof tiling & slating through a combination of their own training, practical site experience and a willingness to assist in the training of others. This recognition takes the form of the award of Master Craftsman status at the company's Craft Awards Luncheon in March.

Charitable activities

Historically, the livery companies have supported a wide spectrum of charitable causes; the company has established two trust funds to enable it to play its part in such work. All members are expected to contribute to the Charitable Trust and the Craft Trust which support, among other causes, children's education and sponsorship of academic and craft prizes.

References

External links
 The Tylers' and Bricklayers' Company

Tylers and Bricklayers
1416 establishments in England